This is a list of colleges and universities in Bangkok, Thailand.

Public

 University of Bangkok Metropolis
 Chulalongkorn University
 Kasetsart University (Bangkhen Campus)
 King Mongkut's Institute of Technology Ladkrabang 
 King Mongkut's Institute of Technology North Bangkok
 King Mongkut's University of Technology Thonburi 
 Mahachulalongkornrajavidyalaya University 
 Mahamakut Buddhist University
 Mahidol University (Phyathai Campus)
 National Institute of Development Administration
 Rajamangala University of Technology
  Rajamangala University of Technology Krung Thep
 Bangkok Technical Campus
 Bophit Phimuk Mahamek Campus
 Krung Thep Phra Nakhon Tai Campus
  Rajamangala University of Technology Rattanakosin
 Bophit Phimuk Chakkrawat Campus
 Pohchang Campus
  Rajamangala University of Technology Phra Nakhon
 Thewet Campus
 Chotiwet Campus
 Bangkok Commerce Campus
 Chumphonkhet Udomsak Campus
 North Bangkok Campus
  Rajamangala University of Technology Tawan-ok
 Chakrabongse Bhuvanarth Campus
 Uthenthawai Campus
 Ramkhamhaeng University
 Silpakorn University (Wang Tha Phra Campus)
 Srinakharinwirot University 
 Thammasat University(Tha Phrachan Campus)

Private
 Assumption University 
 Bangkok University (City Campus)
 Dhurakijpundit University 
 Dusit Thani College
 Kasem Bundit University 
 Mahanakorn University of Technology 
 North Bangkok University
 Rangsit University 
 Ratana Bundit University
 RIC-Regents International College
 SAE Institute Bangkok
 Saint John's University
 Siam University
 Sripathum University
 Stamford International University
 Thongsook College
 University of the Thai Chamber of Commerce
 Webster University
 Krirk University

See also

List of schools in Bangkok
List of universities and colleges in Thailand

L
Bangkok
Universities, Bangkok
Universities
Bangkok